Fatih Tekke (born 9 September 1977), known by his given nickname Sultan, is a Turkish football coach and former player who is currently the manager of İstanbulspor.

Club career

Turkey
Tekke was born in the small town of Köprübaşı, in the province of Trabzon. He joined Trabzonspor, the major team in the area. Tekke was still in his teens when he started to appear in the first team. In 45 matches that he played between 1994–97, he scored six goals. At the beginning of the 1997–98 season he was loaned out to Altay S.K. of İzmir, where he scored eight goals in 24 matches. In a 5–4 defeat to Galatasaray, he scored a hat-trick. However a few weeks later he broke his leg and was out of the game for six months. Upon his return to Trabzonspor, Tekke played another 38 matches and scored six goals before he transferred to Gaziantepspor in the summer of 2000. In this period he made his first appearance for the Turkey national team.

In 2002, Tekke returned to Trabzonspor and was given the captaincy. This was the time Tekke reached the peak of his career. In the 2004–05 season he managed to become the league's top goal scorer with 31 goals, 7 goals ahead of the second placed player and was second for the Golden Foot. During his spell with Trabzonspor, he won two medals for winning the Turkish Cup in consecutive seasons.

Russia
In July 2006, he signed for Zenit Saint Petersburg. On 6 August 2006, Tekke scored on his debut for the club, as he came off the bench against Shinnik Yaroslavl and scored the only goal of the game for his team to win 1–0. Tekke scored the winning goal in the UEFA Cup group stage in a 3–2 victory over AE Larissa. He assisted the second in the 2008 UEFA Cup Final win over Rangers. On 21 October 2008, Tekke scored in the 1–1 draw with BATE Borisov in the Champions League. On 3 February 2010, Tekke signed a three-year contract with FC Rubin Kazan. He only played five games before he decided to return to Turkey, transferring to Beşiktaş.

Back to Turkey
On 1 September 2010, Tekke signed a two-year contract with Besiktas J.K. However, he was only able to play a total of two games before he was sent to Ankaragücü, in the 2010–11 transfer window. In the five matches he played for Ankaragücü, he scored three goals. In the summer transfer season of 2011, the newly promoted team, Orduspor, declared that they had purchased Tekke from Ankaragücü. Tekke was given the number 23 and the captaincy of the team. He then moved to Orduspor and retired soon after. He then became a manager.

International career
Tekke was in the Turkey national squad for U15, U16, U17, U18, U21, and for the Turkey national team. For U15, he played six matches and scored no goals. For U16, he played 18 matches and scored five goals, while also winning the UEFA European Under-16 Championship, held in Ireland. For U17, he played ten matches and scored no goals. For U18, he played 13 matches and scored five goals. For U21, he only played one match.

Between 1998 and 2007, Tekke played 25 matches and scored nine goals for the Turkey national team.

Career statistics

Club

International goals
Scores and results list Turkey's goal tally first, score column indicates score after each Tekke goal.

Managerial statistics

Honours
Turkey
 UEFA European Under-16 Championship: 1994

Trabzonspor
 Turkish Cup: 2002–03, 2003–04

Zenit Saint Petersburg
 Russian Premier League: 2007
 Russian Super Cup: 2008
 UEFA Cup: 2007–08
 UEFA Super Cup: 2008

Rubin Kazan
 Russian Super Cup: 2010

References

External links
 
 Fatih Tekke Interview

1977 births
People from Sürmene
Living people
Association football forwards
Turkish footballers
Trabzonspor footballers
Altay S.K. footballers
Gaziantepspor footballers
FC Zenit Saint Petersburg players
UEFA Cup winning players
FC Rubin Kazan players
Beşiktaş J.K. footballers
MKE Ankaragücü footballers
Orduspor footballers
Turkey international footballers
Turkish expatriate footballers
Turkish expatriate sportspeople in Russia
Expatriate footballers in Russia
Russian Premier League players
Süper Lig players
Turkey youth international footballers
Denizlispor managers